Charlie Luke may refer to:

Charlie Luke (Australian footballer) (1915–1998), Footscray VFL footballer
Charlie Luke (English footballer) (1909–1983), Huddersfield Town association footballer

See also
Charles Luke (disambiguation)
Luke (name)